The Bolts are an independent modern rock band from Irvine, California. Formed in 2007, the band consists of guitarist Heath Farmer, bassist Addam Farmer, keyboardist Austin Farmer, guitarist Ryan Kilpatrick, and drummer Matt Champagne. The entire frontline of the band sings lead vocals with multiple harmony.

The Bolts first experienced local success in 2007 when the band landed five demo songs on the local rock radio station, KROQ, after being together less than four months. Soon after, the band started winning local battles of the bands and other competitions, eventually leading them to earn the title of Orange County’s ‘Best Pop Artist’ from the OC Music Awards.

In 2011, the band provided the soundtrack to an ad campaign for SoBe soft drinks, featuring Sports Illustrated cover supermodel, Kate Upton.
 
The Bolts released their debut EP entitled ‘Fall’ in September 2012, followed by a full length album ‘Wait 'til We're Young, in February, 2013.

References

External links
LA.COM, "The Bolts at 98.7 SSMF stage"
Huffington Post, 'Introducing The Bolts' July 2012
Static 180, "The Bolts Fall EP Review"
The Bolts announce release of debut EP - "Popyoularity", 2012
The Bolts 'Walk Away' Featured in New Kate Upton Commercial, "Encore Orange County", 2012 
band-in-southern-california/ The Bolts is the Hottest Band in Southern California - "Zooey Magazine", 2010
The Bolts Grow Up, Issue New EP, "Orange County Register", 2012
NBC Music Raw, 2010, "NBC Music RAW", 2010
NBC, 2010, "NBC", 2010
"The Bolts Strike Quickly" , Orange County Register, 2007
"Irvine sensations to play Verizon" , Orange County Register, 2008
- "CSULB Freshman Looks to Strike Musically with The Bolts" , Daily 49er, 2007

Rock music groups from California
Musical groups established in 2007